Jimmy Zhingchak - Agent of D.I.S.C.O. is a one-shot comic book written by Saurav Mohapatra, with art by Anupam Sinha. It was originally published by Virgin Comics in 2008 in collaboration with UTV Spotboy.

Plot
A parody of 80s Hindi cinema's fascination with disco and Hindi movies of the period, it deals with the rise of Jimmy, a young dancer who helps defend India from Sir John and his dreaded organization F.I.R.A.N.G. He is helped by Col. Jaani of the Department of Internal Security and Covert Operation (D.I.S.C.O.). The foreword was written by Mithun Chakraborty, an Indian film star known for his DISCO potboilers.

Themes
The comic introduces the concept of Zhingchak, a nonsensical homage to the Force of Star Wars and Mojo from the Austin Powers movies. It uses hackneyed plot devices from Hindi movies like a blind mother (made famous by Nirupa Roy), miraculous restoration of sight by divine intervention (again a Nirupa Roy staple), and long lost twin brothers.

See also
 Mithun Chakraborty
 Disco Dancer
 Kasam Paida Karne Wale Ki
 Dance Dance
 Classic Dance of Love
 Dance Bangla Dance
 Dance India Dance

References

2008 comics debuts
Comics by Saurav Mohapatra
Zhingchak, Jimmy
Zhingchak, Jimmy
Zhingchak, Jimmy
Zhingchak, Jimmy
Zhingchak, Jimmy